Daniel Zwicker (22 January 1612 – 10 November 1678) was a German physician from Danzig, and a Socinian theologian and controversialist of the Polish Brethren.

Life
He was the son of Friedrich Zwicker, Lutheran minister of the Church of St. Bartholomew at Danzig. He was educated for the medical profession at the University of Königsberg which he entered in 1629, and where he graduated with a Doctor's degree. Florian Crusius first influenced him in the direction of Unitarian theology.

He met with considerable opposition, beginning with his brother Friedrich who had succeeded his father as minister. He left Danzig for Poland. Meeting some Hutterite missionaries from Slovakia, around 1650, he spent time at Bruderhofs in the community of Andreas Ehrenpreis; but returned to Danzig.
He returned to Strassin, where he lived for a while.

From 1657 he moved to the Netherlands, and died in Amsterdam.

Works
His main theological interest lay in patristics. His Irenicum Irenicorum (1658) attempted to reconstruct Christian theology before the Nicene Creed. Zwicker proposed that Christ's divinity, the pre-existence of Christ, and the incarnation were inventions of early heretics. It was attacked in detail by George Bull. Bull's biographer Robert Nelson considered him an influential Unitarian, writing:

He was criticized by Samuel Przypkowski, and fell into controversy with Jan Amos Komenský (Comenius). Following David Blondel's Joanna Papissa (1657) which disproved the historical reality of Pope Joan Zwicker criticized the Joanna Papissa restituta of Samuel Desmarets (Maresius) anonymously, in a work published with those of Étienne de Courcelles.

Notes

Further reading
 Peter G. Bietenholz (1997). Daniel Zwicker (1612–1678). Peace, Tolerance and God the One and Only, Florence: Olschki.

External links
 Zwicker, Daniel in the Global Anabaptist Mennonite Encyclopedia Online

1612 births
1678 deaths
Antitrinitarians
17th-century German physicians
17th-century German Protestant theologians
Polish Unitarian theologians
Physicians from Gdańsk
German emigrants to the Netherlands
German male non-fiction writers
17th-century German writers
17th-century German male writers